Anna Kalinskaya and Viktória Kužmová were the defending champions, but chose not to participate.

Harriet Dart and Lesley Kerkhove won the title, defeating Sarah Beth Grey and Eden Silva in the final, 6–3, 6–2.

Seeds

Draw

Draw

References
Main Draw

Engie Open de Seine-et-Marne - Doubles